1972 presidential election may refer to:

 1972 Cambodian presidential election
 1972 Salvadoran presidential election
 1972 Icelandic presidential election
 1972 Malagasy presidential election
 1972 Panamanian presidential election
 1972 Portuguese presidential election
 1972 South Korean presidential election
 1972 United States presidential election